Delaware Boundary Markers is a national historic district located on the State boundary lines between Delaware, Maryland, and Pennsylvania.  The district includes 94 contributing sites along the Mason–Dixon line and includes the Transpeninsular Line, "Post Marked West" site, Mason–Dixon line, Tangent Line, The Arc, and The Twelve-Mile Circle.

It was added to the National Register of Historic Places in 1975.

References

Initial points
Houses on the National Register of Historic Places in Delaware
Historic districts on the National Register of Historic Places in Delaware
Italianate architecture in Delaware
Houses in Sussex County, Delaware
National Register of Historic Places in Sussex County, Delaware
Mason–Dixon line